The Brixton riots of 1995 began on 13 December after the death of a black 26-year-old, Wayne Douglas, in police custody. Douglas had allegedly robbed a couple in bed at knifepoint hours earlier. Trouble broke out after what had been a peaceful protest outside the Brixton Police Station where the death occurred. With several hundred people involved, the riot resulted in damage to property and vehicles in the area. Police sealed off a three-kilometre (2 mile) area around Brixton in south London.

The riot lasted for five hours. 22 people were arrested and charged with public order offences, theft and criminal damage. Three police officers were hurt.

The then-Deputy Prime Minister, Michael Heseltine, condemned the riots and said "efforts to improve Brixton would continue".

Death of Wayne Douglas 
Wayne Douglas was in police custody to be  questioned about a burglary. Police reported that he collapsed in Brixton Police Station. The police statement said that Douglas died after collapsing while being questioned. Although the post-mortem on Douglas revealed that he had died of heart failure, the inquest into his death showed that he had been held face-down with his hands cuffed behind his back on four occasions. The post-mortem also revealed that Douglas had suffered from heart disease.

The riots 
The picketing of Brixton Police Station over the death of Douglas reportedly developed into a march down Brixton Road (Brixton High Street). Violence was triggered by a standoff between the police and about 100 demonstrators. Witnesses have reported hearing groups of black youths shouting "Killers, killers" at the police. Some eyewitness accounts describe the police presence at the demonstration as "incredibly heavy-handed".

The BBC reported that "hundreds" of black and white youths participated in the riot. Rioters attacked police, ransacked shops and burned cars. According to the police "Officers were wearing protective clothing because we had reports of missiles being thrown." In an attempt to contain the riot around 50 police officers in riot gear formed lines to close Brixton's main road (Brixton Road), preventing anyone from entering the area. The street had been the scene of rioting in 1981. Police also sealed off a two-mile area around the centre of Brixton and closed Brixton and Stockwell stations. A police helicopter was dispatched over Brixton. It was reported that shots were fired as the centre of the demonstration moved into the area of the Ritzy Cinema. It was also reported that a crowd of at least ten rioters pulled a police motorcyclist from his machine. The Dogstar, Coldharbour Lane was among the businesses attacked by the rioters. Formerly The Atlantic, a predominantly black pub, and recently refurbished. The riot later developed into what police called "sporadic pockets of trouble in the area around Brixton town centre". The police stated that "We gave them every opportunity to move off peacefully but they hadn't done so."

One police officer suffered a broken shoulder, fractured ribs and bruising during the riots. He praised the Territorial Support Group for protecting him from rioters after he was knocked off his motorbike and beaten.

Causes 
The New York Times reported that local residents were outraged by the death of a black man in police custody and saw the riots as expression of alienation in an impoverished area devastated by race riots in 1981. It quotes Harold Douglas, 39, as saying: 
Last night happened because the only time a black man is seen and listened to is when he comes out on the street...They cause a million pounds of damage and then people start taking notice.

At a news conference at the time, Metropolitan Police Commissioner Paul Condon is quoted to have said:
It was not Brixton rioting last night. It was a small minority of thugs and criminals who, as ever, were looking for the opportunity to embark on criminal activities.

A local resident at the time stated:
Local people are not only pissed off with the death of Wayne Douglas but the whole gentrification of Brixton. Council houses and houses occupied by squatters are being sold off and local pubs like the Atlantic, traditionally run by black people, was opened last week by yuppies as 'The Dog Star'. In anger this was smashed, looted and burnt out. The £33 million City Challenge development including CCTV is only of benefit to big business not local stallholders.

SchNews quoted another local resident, identified as 'Joyce', as saying:
People were putting up barricades. There were hundreds of people involved, mostly young black and white people and they were local, they weren't outsiders. This was a combination of black people dying in police custody and the way Brixton is at the moment. The place is being yuppified with City Challenge while unemployed centres, adventure playgrounds and libraries are getting shut.

Cultural references

 Carter USM's song "And God Created Brixton" from the 1997 album A World Without Dave was written about the 1995 Brixton riots.

See also
 Brixton
 Brixton riot (1981)
 Brixton riot (1985)
 2011 London riots
 Urban riots

References

1995 riots
1995 in London
Black British history
Brixton
Deaths by person in London
December 1995 events in the United Kingdom
Metropolitan Police operations
Riots in London